Kenneth Zeigbo (born 16 June 1977) is a Nigerian retired professional footballer who played as a striker.

Career
Zeigbo started his career playing with Nigerian teams NEPA Lagos and then Enugu Rangers. On 7 August 1997, he made his debut for the Nigeria national team in a match against Cameroon, also scoring a goal during the game. He then moved to Europe, joining Legia Warsaw and immediately scoring a winning goal in his debut, a Polish Supercup match against Widzew Lodz.

Zeigbo was then noticed by Venezia scouts and signed by the arancioneroverdi, then playing in Serie A, in 1998. He failed to break into the first team and was immediately relegated into the reserves and successively loaned out to United Arab Emirates side Al Ain, Libyan club Al-Ahly and Serie C1 team L'Aquila. In 2002, he returned to Venezia, only marking three appearances as a substitute before being sold to Serie C2 side Belluno in January 2003. After two difficult seasons and a number of serious injuries, Zeigbo left professional football and moved to Eccellenza Veneto amateurs Prix Camisano in 2005, leaving them in 2007 to sign for Eccellenza Sardinia side A.S.D. Villasimius, joining former Internazionale and Cagliari player Fabio Macellari.

After retiring as a player he became an owner of a security company in Italy.

Honours
Premio Ocio Ciò: 2013-14

References

External links
 
 

1977 births
Living people
Nigerian footballers
Nigeria international footballers
Association football forwards
Serie A players
Serie B players
Ekstraklasa players
Al Ain FC players
Venezia F.C. players
Legia Warsaw players
Rangers International F.C. players
L'Aquila Calcio 1927 players
A.C. Belluno 1905 players
Footballers from Enugu
NEPA Lagos players
Nigerian expatriate footballers
Nigerian expatriate sportspeople in Poland
Expatriate footballers in Poland
Nigerian expatriate sportspeople in Italy
Expatriate footballers in Italy
Nigerian expatriate sportspeople in the United Arab Emirates
Expatriate footballers in the United Arab Emirates
Nigerian expatriate sportspeople in Libya
Expatriate footballers in Libya
UAE Pro League players